Bloom (stylized as bloom) is the third studio album by American musician Machine Gun Kelly. It was released on May 12, 2017, by Bad Boy, Interscope Records, and EST 19XX. The album was preceded by the hit single, "Bad Things", a collaboration with Camila Cabello, which reached number four on the Billboard Hot 100, The album features guest appearances from Quavo, Hailee Steinfeld, Ty Dolla $ign, James Arthur, and Camila Cabello.

Singles
On October 14, 2016, "Bad Things", featuring a duet with Cuban-American singer Camila Cabello, was released as the lead single from Bloom. The song peaked at number 4 in the United States and number 16 in the United Kingdom.

The second single from the album, "At My Best", featuring American singer Hailee Steinfeld, was released on March 17, 2017. It peaked at number 60 on the US Billboard Hot 100.

Originally released as a promotional single on April 13, 2017, "Trap Paris", featuring Quavo and Ty Dolla Sign, was released as the third single for Bloom on May 12, 2017. Its accompanying video was directed by Ben Griffin and debuted on MGK's VEVO on June 7, 2017.

The fourth single from the album, "Go for Broke", featuring UK singer James Arthur, was named as the official theme for WWE SummerSlam 2017 and sent to top 40 radio on June 27, 2017.

The fifth single from the album, "The Break Up", was released on December 15, 2017. The music video, directed by Jordan Wozy, was released on February 14, 2018.

"27", the sixth single, was released April 21, 2018 (a day before Kelly's 28th birthday). Its music video was released the same day.

Commercial performance
Bloom debuted at number eight on the US Billboard 200 with 57,000 album-equivalent units, of which 38,000 were pure album sales. In its second week, the album dropped to number 29 selling 16,500 total album-equivalent units; and in its third week, the album dropped to 43, selling another 11,000 album equivalent units. As of early June 2017, the album had sold a total of 85,000 units.

Critical reception

Bloom received generally positive reviews from music critics. On Metacritic, which assigns a normalized rating out of 100 from reviews from mainstream critics, gave the album an average score of 72 out of 100 based on 4 reviews. In a positive review, Preezy of XXL praised the growth seen between General Admission and Bloom. He praised both the lyrical content and production on the album. However, he was critical in the fact that the album was not strong enough to be his big comeback after the critical failure of General Admission. In a positive review, Aaron McKrell of HipHopDX gave the album a 4/5, and praised Kelly's vocal delivery on the album, along with the production and lyrical content. Dan Leroy of Alternative Press gave the album 3.5 out of 5 stars. He stated that Kelly's vocals were amazing and his lyrics seemed sincere, but that it felt like listening to more of a persona than to an attempt to address a sometimes messy life. In a mixed review, Neil Z Yeung of AllMusic gave the album 3 stars, stating the half of the songs on the album were made to be radio hits, and that it was toned down from Kelly's previous two albums. However, he said the introspective maturity of the album was admirable.

Track listing

Charts

Weekly charts

Year-end charts

Certifications

References

External links

2017 albums
Machine Gun Kelly (musician) albums
Bad Boy Records albums
Interscope Records albums
Albums produced by Happy Perez
Albums produced by the Runners
Albums produced by Sonny Digital
Alternative hip hop albums by American artists